Weights and measures acts are acts of the British Parliament determining the regulation of weights and measures. It also refers to similar royal and parliamentary acts of the Kingdoms of England and Scotland and the medieval Welsh states. The earliest of these were originally untitled but were given descriptive glosses or titles based upon the monarch under whose reign they were promulgated. Several omnibus modern acts are entitled the Weights and Measures Act and are distinguished by the year of their enactment.

Background 
There have been many laws concerned with weights and measures in the United Kingdom or parts of it over the last 1,000 or so years. The acts may catalogue lawful weights and measures, prescribe the mechanism for inspection and enforcement of the use of such weights and measures and may set out circumstances under which they may be amended. Modern legislation may, in addition to specific requirements, set out circumstances under which the incumbent minister may amend the legislation by means of statutory instruments. Prior to the Weights and Measures Act 1985, weights and measures acts were only concerned with trade law where the weight or size of the goods being traded was important. The 1985 act, however, had a broader scope, encompassing all aspects covered by the European Economic Community (EEC) European Commission directive 80/181/EEC.

As of 25 April 2012, the current primary legislation in the United Kingdom is the 1985 Act, which was last amended by statutory instrument in 2011. Statutory instruments made under the authority of the Act do not amend the Act , but regulate particular areas covered by the Act.

The Act is currently enforced by the 200 Trading Standards Offices managed by local authorities around the country. Definitions of units of measurements and the technical equipment relating to weights and measures are provided by the National Measurement Office, an agency of the Department for Business, Innovation and Skills.

Statute measure 
Historically, many units had various customary definitions—by locality or trade, for example. Where these units also had a standard, legally defined definition, such as given in a weights and measures act, this was known as the statute measure. So a land area might be given as 24 acres—statute measure, to clarify that it was the acre defined in statute, rather than a customary acre of a different size, that was being used. Units that had statute-defined measures as well as customary measures were the acre, mile, perch, pole and ton. The level of legal enforcement of statute measures achieved between the mid nineteenth and the beginning of the twentieth centuries meant that only "statute mile" and "statute ton" needed qualifying beyond then. The statute mile still needed to be differentiated from the nautical mile, but the others, and the term "statute measure" itself, are now only used in a historical context.

Metric units of measure

The Weights and Measures Act 1897 provided that metric units could be used in addition to the traditional imperial units for purposes of trade. In practice, the actual choice of units was restricted by price marking orders which listed packaging sizes and pricing structures that might be used in specific circumstances. Prior to 1973, when the United Kingdom joined the EEC, such specifications were almost all in imperial units.

As part of its attempt to harmonise units of measure between the member states of its Internal Market, the European Commission (EC) issued directive 80/181/EEC which set out the units of measure that should be used for what it called "economic, public health, public safety, and administrative" purposes. To comply with this directive, the Weights and Measures Act 1985 extended the scope of Trading Standards responsibilities from just matters related to trade to all aspects of the directive. For example, it was the Trading Standards Office that criticised the use of sub-standard weighing machines in NHS hospitals.

To help ease the EC's desired transition from sole use of imperial units to sole use of metric units, the directive permitted the use of what were termed "supplementary indicators"—the continued use of imperial units alongside the metric units catalogued by the directive (dual labelling). The initial intention was to prohibit dual labelling after the end of 1989, with metric units only being allowed after that date. This deadline was later extended: first to the end of 1999, then to the end of 2009. Finally, in 2007, the European Union (EU, as it had become) and the EC confirmed that the UK would be permitted to continue indefinitely to use imperial units such as pints, miles, pounds and ounces as at present. The Gloucestershire County Council Trading Standards Department confirmed the EU ruling that the previous deadline for ending dual labelling had been abolished.

There are still a few cases where imperial units are required to be used and where metric units are not permitted within the scope of the Weights and Measures Act, such as the pint for the sale of draught beer and cider, and miles and yards for distances on road signage. Milk in returnable containers may be sold by the pint and the troy ounce may be used for the sale of precious metals. In addition, British law specifies which non-metric units may be used with dual labelling (for example the imperial gallon, but not the US gallon).

England

Acts of the Witenagemot

Numerous acts of the Saxon kings are known to have been lost. Those that have survived include:

10th century
2 Edgar c. 8 (959  963):

The statute also survives in a few other Old English and Latin copies, some which omit mention of London and describe "the measure held at Winchester", an indication that a standard ell or yard was nominally in use:

John Quincy Adams's 1821 report on the history of English weights and measures notes of this act that "it was never observed".

Acts of the Royal Council

11th century
3 William I c. 7 (1068):

12th century
9 Richard I c. 27 (1197):

Acts of Parliament

Statutes of uncertain date
The statutes of uncertain date are generally dated to the mid-to-late 13th century.

The Assize of Bread and Ale, sometimes dated to 51 Henry III (1267–8).
Statute I - Section III.

Statutum de Pistoribus, et cetera
The Statute concerning Bakers, et cetera

Tractatus de Ponderibus et Mensuris
It is important to note when reading it that, in the Latin and English text, "hundred" (and the Latin numeral ) is used for four separate concepts: the Germanic long hundred of 120, the short hundred of 100, several units of either value, and a separate unit (the hundredweight) of 108 pounds.

The form in which it appears in Cotton  Claudius D2 where it is dated to 31 Edw. I (1303) is:

The original Tractatus was written in Latin.  Some later English translation copies contain differences that change the meaning.  One of the copies of the Tractatus contains the first use of the word avoirdupois in England. However, the word does not refer to a weight system but to a class of goods: viz., heavy goods sold by weight rather than by capacity, count, or other means. However, it does not count as the first occurrence of the word in English.

Statutum de Admensuratione Terrase
Also known as "A Statute for the Measuring of Land" or "An Ordinance for Measuring of Land" or "33 Edw. I st. 6. (1305)".
"When an Acre of Land contianeth 10 Perches in Length, then it shall be in Breadth 16 Perches."

 The Statute on the Composition of Yards and Perches ( "On the Composition of Arms [=Ells] and Perches") is dated to 1266  1303. Its content varies among surviving accounts. One reads:

The Liber Horn account reads:
"And be it remembered that the iron yard of our Lord the King containeth 3 feet and no more, and a foot ought to contain 12 inches by the right measure of this yard measured, to wit, the 36th part of this yard rightly measured maketh 1 inch neither more nor less and 5 yards and a half make a perch that is 16 feet and a half measured by the aforesaid yard of our Lord the King."
The rod thus became 16½ feet instead of 15.

13th century

9 Henry III c. 25 (1225)

The Magna Carta of 1215 was not ratified by Parliament until 1225, by which time it had become substantially abridged. Chapter 35 of the Magna Carta of 1215 (which dealt with weights and measures) became chapter 25 of the Magna Carta of 1225.

14th century
14 Edward III st. 1 c. 12 (1340)
"Bushels and Weights shall be made and sent into every Country."

18 Edward III st. 2 c. 4 (1344)
"Commissions to assay Weights and Measures shall be repealed, and none such granted."

25 Edward III st. 5 c. 9 (1350)

25 Edward III st. 5 c. 10 (1350)

27 Edward III st. 2 c. 10 (1353)

 A chapter of the Statute of the Staple that provides for justices to be appointed to hear charges of measuring fraud at the staple ports. Those found guilty were liable for quadruple damages and 2 years' imprisonment.

31 Edward III st. 1 c. 2 (1357)
"No Wool shall be bought by Fraud to abate the Price thereof. Weights shall be sent to all the Shires."

4 Richard II st. 2 c. 1 (1380)
"All Vessels of Wine, Honey, and Oil brought into this realm shall be gauged."

13 Richard II st. 1 c. 9 (1389)
"There shall be but one Weight and one Measure throughout the Realm, saving in the County of Lancaster. The Weight of Wool, and the Refuse thereof."

15 Richard II c. 4. (1391)
"There shall be but eight Bushels of Corn striked to the Quarter."

16 Richard II c. 3. (1392)
"The Clerk of the Market shall carry with him all his Weights and Measures signed."

15th century
1 Henry V c. 10 (1413)
An Act concerning the true Measure of Corn.

2 Henry V st. 2. c. 4 (1414)
"There Shall be no gilding of Silver Ware but of the Allay of English Sterling."
First notice of troy weight in statute.

8 Henry VI c. 5 (1429)
"Every City and Borough shall have a common Balance and Weight. Who may buy Wool and Yarn."

18 Henry VI c. 16 (1439)
"There shall be but one Measure of Cloth through the Realm by the Yard and the Inch, and not by the Yard and Handful, according to the London Measure."
""

18 Henry VI c. 17 (1439)
"Vessels of Wine, Oyl, and Honey, shall be gauged"

 
11 Henry VII c. 4 (1494)

An Act for Weights and Measures.
"The Names of the Cities and Towns limited for the keeping of Weights and Measures."

12 Henry VII c. 5 (1496)
An Act for Weights and Measures.
"That the Measure of a Bushel contain viij. Gallons of Wheat, and that every Gallon contain viij. li. of Wheat of Troy Weight, and every Pound contain xij. Ounces of Troy Weight, and every Ounce contain xx. Sterlings, and every Sterling be of the Weight of xxxij. Corns of Wheat that grew in the Midst of the Ear of Wheat, according to the old Laws of this Land."

16th century
 Verdict of the Pyx 18 Henry VIII (1527)
"And whereas heretofore the merchaunte paid for coynage of every pounde Towre of fyne gold weighing xi oz. quarter Troye ii s. vi d. Nowe it is determyned by the king's highness, and his said councelle that the foresaid pounde Towre shall be no more used and occupied but al maner of golde and sylver shall be wayed by the pounde Troye, which maketh xii oz. Troy, which exceedith the pounde Towre in weight iii quarters of the oz."

23 Henry VIII c. 4 (1531)
An Act that no Brewers of Beer or Ale shall make their Barrels, Kilderkins or Firkins within them, and how much the same Barrels, et cetera shall contain.

24 Henry VIII c. 3 (1532)
An Act for flesh to be sold by weight, and the prices limited.
"Beef, pork, mutton and veal shall be sold by weight called Haver-de-pois."

24 Henry VIII c. 4 (1532)
"An acre shall be counted 160 perches, and every perch 16-foot and a half.

5 & 6 Edward VI c. 6 (1552)
An Act for the true making of Woolen Cloth.
"XIV. And that all and every Broad Cloth and Clothes called Taunton Clothes, Bridgwaters, and other Clothes which shall be made after the said Feast in Taunton, Bridgwater or in other Places of like Sort, shall contain at the Water in Length betwixt twelve and thirteen Yards, Yard and Inch of the Rule, and in Breadth seven Quarters of a Yard: (2) And every narrow Cloth made after the said Feast in the said Towns or elsewhere of like Sorts, shall contain in the Water in Length betwixt three and twenty and five and twenty Yards, Yard and Inch as is aforesaid, and in Breadth one Yard of like Measure; (3) and every such Cloth, both Broad and Narrow being well scowred, thicked, milled and fully dried, shall weigh xxxiv. li. the Piece at the least.XV. And that all Clothes named Check-Kersie and Straits, which shall be made after the said Feast shall contain being wet between seventeen and eighteen Yards, with the Inches as is aforesaid, and in Breadth one Yard at the least at the Water; and being well scowred, thicked, milled and fully dried, shall weigh xxiv. li. the Piece at the least."
"XV. And that all Clothes named Check-Kersie and Straits, which shall be made after the said Feast shall contain being wet between seventeen and eighteen Yards, with the Inches as is aforesaid, and in Breadth one Yard at the least at the Water; and being well scowred, thicked, milled and fully dried, shall weigh xxiv. li. the Piece at the least."

4 & 5 Philip and Mary c. 5. par. IX (1557–8)
An act touching the making of woolen clothes.
"IX. Item, That every ordinary kersie mentioned in the said act shall contain in length in the water betwixt xvi. and xvii. yards, yard and inch; and being well scoured thicked, milled, dressed and fully dried, shall weigh nineteen pounds the piece at the least:..."

23 Elizabeth I c. 8 (1581)
An Act touching the true melting, making and working of Wax.
"...fill and sell or cause to be filled or sold or offered to be sold any Barrel, Kilderkin or Firkin with Honey, for or in the Name of a Barrel, Kilderkin or Firkin containing less than two and thirty Wine Gallons the Barrel, sixteen Wine Gallons the Kilderkin, and eight Wine Gallons the Firkin; every Person and Persons so offending shall forfeit and lose for every Half Gallon so lacking five Shillings of English Money."

35 Elizabeth c. 6 (1593)
An Act against converting of great Houses into several Tenements, and for Restraint of Inmates and Inclosures, in and near about the City of London and Westminster.
"... A Mile shall contain eight Furlongs, every Furlong forty Poles, and every Pole shall contain sixteen Foot and an half."
This is the codification and namesake of the statute mile.

35 Elizabeth I c. 10. par. III (1593)
An act for the reformation of sundry abuses in clothes, called Devonshire kerjies or dozens, according to a proclamation of the thirty-fourth year of the reign of our sovereign lady the Queen that now is.
"(2) and each and every of the same Devonshire kersies or dozens, so being raw, and as it cometh forth off the weaver's loom (without racking, stretching, straining or other device to encrease the length thereof) shall contain in length between fifteen and sixteen yards by the measure of yard and inch by the rule, ..."

17th century
16 Charles I c. 19 (1640)
An Act for the better ordering and regulating of the Office of Clerk of the Market, allowed and confirmed by this Statutes; and for the Reformation of false Weights and Measures.

22 Charles II c. 8 (1670)
An Act for ascertaining the Measures of Corn and Salt.
First mention of Winchester bushel in statute.

22 & 23 Charles II c. 12 (1670)
An additional Act for ascertaining the Measures of Corn and Salt.

8 & 9 William III c. 22. s. 9 (1696–7)
"...every round bushel with a plain and even bottom being eighteen inches and a half wide throughout and eight inches deep shall be determined a legal Winchester bushel according to the Standard of His Majesty's Exchequer."
First definition of Winchester bushel in statute (≈2150.42 cubic inches).

18th century
11 and 12 William III c. 15 (1700)
An Act for ascertaining the Measures for retailing Ale and Beer.

1 Anne st. 1. c. 15 (1701)
An Act to ascertain the Water Measure of Fruit.

Great Britain

Acts of Parliament

18th century
5 & 6 Anne c. 27 (1706)
An Act for continuing several Subsidies, Impositions and Duties and for making Provisions therein mentioned to raise Money by Way of Loan for the Service of the War, and other Her Majesty's necessary and important Occasions, and for ascertaining the Wine Measure.

This statute is the origin of the US gallon, also known as the Queen Anne Gallon, Queen Anne Wine Gallon, or pre-1824 British gallon.

False Weights and Scales Act 1770 (10 Geo. III c. 44)
An Act for more effectually preventing Traders in exciseable Commodities from using false Weights and Scales and for explaining and amending several Acts of Parliament relating to Hackney Coaches and Chairs

Weights and Measures Act 1795 (35 Geo. III c. 102)
An Act for the more effectual Prevention of the Use of defective Weights, and of false and unequal Balances.

Weights and Measures Act 1797 (37 Geo. III c. 143)
An Act to explain and amend an Act made in the thirty-fifth Year of the Reign of his present Majesty, intituled, An Act for the more effectual Prevention of the use of defective Weights, and of false and unequal Balances.

19th century

Weights and Measures Act 1815 (55 Geo. III c. 43)
An Act for the more effectual Prevention of the Use of false and deficient Measures.

Weights and Measures Act 1824 (5 Geo. IV c. 74)
An Act for ascertaining and establishing Uniformity of Weights and Measures.

This is the origin of Imperial units. This statute repeals nearly all previous weights and measures legislation, listing them in chronological order (by regnal year but without dates) beginning with "ancient statutes of uncertain date."

Weights and Measures Act 1825 (6 Geo. IV c. 12)
An Act to prolong the Time of the Commencement of an Act of the last Session of Parliament, for ascertaining and establishing Uniformity of Weights and Measures and to amend the said Act.

Weights and Measures Act 1834 (4 & 5 William IV c. 49)
An Act to amend and render more effectual Two Acts of the Fifth and Sixth Years of the Reign of His late Majesty King George the Fourth, relating to Weights and Measures.

 5 & 6 William IV c. 63 (1835)
Also known as the Weights and Measures Act 1835; originally entitled "An Act to repeal an Act of the Fourth and Fifth Year of His present Majesty relating to Weights and Measures, and to make other Provisions instead thereof".
Established the imperial stone and hundredweight of 14 and 112 lbs. respectively, based on the wool stone of Edward III

Weights and Measures Act 1855 (18 & 19 Vict. c. 72)
An Act for legalising and preserving the restored Standards of Weights and Measures
The 1834 burning of Parliament had destroyed the physical standards referred to in earlier statues; the 1835 act ignored this fact. New copies were created in accordance with the advice of a scientific commission, and the 1855 act made them the "restored Standards".

Weights and Measures Act 1859 (22 & 23 Vict. c. 56)
An Act to amend the Act of the fifth and sixth years of King William the Fourth, chapter sixty-three, relating to weights and measures.

Metric Weights and Measures Act 1864 (27 & 28 Vict. c. 117)
An Act to render permissive the Use of the Metric System of Weights and Measures.

Weights and Measures Act 1878 (41 & 42 Vict. c. 49)
An Act to consolidate the Law relating to Weights and Measures.
This statute abolished the troy pound, effective January 1879.

Weights and Measures Act 1889 (52 & 53 Vict. c. 21)
An Act for amending the Law relating to Weights and Measures and for other purposes connected therewith.

Weights and Measures (Purchase) Act 1892 (55 & 56 Vict. c. 18)

Weights and Measures Act 1893 (56 & 57 Vict. c. 19)

Weights and Measures (Metric System) Act 1897 (60 & 61 Vict. c. 46)
An Act to legalise the Use of Weights and Measures of the Metric System.

"Weights and Measures Acts of 1878 to 1893" was the collective title of the following Acts:
Weights and Measures Act 1878 (41 & 42 Vict. c 49)
Weights and Measures Act 1889 (52 & 53 Vict. c 21)
Weights and Measures (Purchase) Act 1892 (55 & 56 Vict. c. 18)
Weights and Measures Act 1893 (56 & 57 Vict. c. 19)

20th century

Weights and Measures Act 1904 (4 Edward VII c. 28)

Sale of Food (Weights and Measures) Act 1926 (16 & 17 Geo. V c. 63)

Weights and Measures (Amendment) Act 1926 (16 & 17 Geo. V c. 8)

Weights and Measures Act 1963

Weights and Measures etc. Act 1976

Weights and Measures Act 1979
 This Act introduces the Average Quantity principle for packaged goods into UK law for the first time. The 1979 Act was replaced by Part V of the 1985 Act

Weights and Measures Act 1985
The Act defines the four primary units of measurement as the metre or the yard (defined in terms of the metre) for length, and the kilogram or pound (defined in terms of the kilogram) for mass. The Act also requires standard physical examples to be maintained (known as "United Kingdom primary standards") for each of the four primary units.
In addition, the definitions of units which are multiples or sub-multiples of the primary units are defined, in terms of the primary units, and given as: mile, foot, inch, kilometre, decimetre, centimetre, millimetre, acre, square yard, square foot, hectare, decare, are, square metre, square decimetre, square centimetre, square millimetre, cubic metre, cubic decimetre, cubic centimetre, hectolitre, litre, decilitre, centilitre, millilitre, gallon, quart, pint, gill, fluid ounce, pound, ounce, ounce troy, tonne, kilogram, hectogram, gram, carat (metric) and milligram.
As originally enacted, the act also defined, in the same way, units which could not be used for trade as: furlong, chain, square mile, rood, square inch, cubic yard, cubic foot, cubic inch, bushel, peck, fluid drachm, minim, ton, hundredweight, cental, quarter, stone, dram, grain, pennyweight, ounce apothecaries, drachm, scruple, metric ton and quintal.
, following multiple amendments over the years since enactment, the metre, yard, kilogram and pound remain as the primary defined units and with the requirement to maintain the "United Kingdom primary standards" for them.
At the same time, all the imperial units, except pint and ounce troy (but including all of those which were originally defined as not to be used for trade) were reclassified as being available for use for trade as supplementary indications, namely: mile, furlong, chain, yard, foot, inch, square mile, acre, rood, square yard, square foot, square inch, cubic yard, cubic foot, cubic inch, bushel, peck, gallon, quart, gill, fluid ounce, fluid drachm, minim, ton, hundredweight, cental, quarter, stone, pound, ounce, dram, grain, pennyweight, ounce apothecaries, drachm, scruple and quintal. The tonne was also reclassified as being available for use for trade as a supplementary unit of measure,

See also
 Other weights and measures acts

References

External links

Confident Consumers – Buying and Selling – Weights and Measures from the Department of Trade and Industry
A Dictionary of Units Originally from Exeter University
Thoburn v Sunderland City Council (2002)
List of English / British monarchs in whose name weights and measures legislation was enacted

Acts of the Parliament of England
Acts of the Parliament of Great Britain
Acts of the Parliament of the United Kingdom
Law of the United Kingdom
Metrication in the United Kingdom
Standards organisations in the United Kingdom
Trading standards